Bayevsky (masculine), Bayevskaya (feminine), or Bayevskoye (neuter) may refer to:
Bayevsky District, a district of Altai Krai, Russia
Bayevsky (rural locality), a rural locality (a settlement) in Oryol Oblast, Russia